Antonio Castrejon (1625–1690) was a Spanish painter.

Life
Castrejon was born at Madrid in 1625. He was a pupil of Francisco Fernandez, and possessed more facility in colouring than skill in drawing. His best works are of small dimensions, but he sometimes painted large altar-pieces, as the Martyrdom of Santa Lucia, in the church of San Felipe el Real at Madrid, which was destroyed by fire in 1718. He painted figures in the architectural pieces of Roque Ponce and of Josef Garcia, and groups within the flower-garlands of Gabriel de la Corte. He died at Madrid in 1690.

References

Sources
Antonio Palomino, An account of the lives and works of the most eminent Spanish painters, sculptors and architects, 1724, first English translation, 1739, p. 127
Allende-Salazar, Juan, José Antolínez, pintor madrileño, Boletín de la Sociedad Española de Excursiones, vol. XXIII, Madrid, 1915.
Agulló Cobo, Mercedes (1981). Más noticias sobre pintores madrileños de los siglos XVI al XVIII. Madrid: Excmo. Ayuntamiento de Madrid. .
Gutiérrez Pastor, Ismael, Antonio de Castrejón como retratista y otras obras de su hijo Baltasar, Anuario del Departamento de Historia y Teoría del Arte, (UAM), vol. III, 1991, p. 101-108.
Salvador Prieto, Ma. Socorro, Una Inmaculada de Antonio Castrejón, pintor del siglo XVII, V Jornadas de Arte (5th Arts Journal). Velázquez and the Art of his Time, CSIC, editorial Alpuerto, Madrid, 1991, p. 289-294

Attribution:
 

1625 births
1690 deaths
Artists from Madrid
17th-century Spanish painters
Spanish male painters